is the head temple of a branch of the Shugendō religion called Kinpusen-Shugendō in Yoshino district, Nara Prefecture, Japan.  According to tradition, it was founded by En no Gyōja, who propagated a form of mountain asceticism drawing from Shinto and  Buddhist beliefs. Along with Ōminesan-ji Temple, it is considered the most important temple in Shugendō.

The temple's main building, the "Zaō-Hall" (Zaōdō) dedicated to Zaō gongen (蔵王権現), is the second largest wooden structure in Japan after the Great Buddha Hall at Tōdai-ji in Nara.  Kinpusen-ji is a junction in a series of stops on pilgrimage routes.

A Shinto shrine dedicated to Inari Ōkami is attached to the main compound. In 1963, the Temple constructed a hall named Southern Court Mystic Law Hall (Nanchō Myōhōden) to appease the soul of the four emperors of the Southern Court and others who lost their lives in many battles since the "Northern and Southern Courts period" (Nanboku-chō period, 1336–1392).  The principal image is the statue of Gautama Buddha (Shaka Nyōrai).

In 2004, it was designated as part of a UNESCO World Heritage Site under the name Sacred Sites and Pilgrimage Routes in the Kii Mountain Range.

Images

See also
Sacred Sites and Pilgrimage Routes in the Kii Mountain Range
Shugendō
List of National Treasures of Japan (temples)
Tourism in Japan

References

External links
Official website
Live camera, Kimpusen-ji, Zaōdō

Buddhist temples in Nara Prefecture
World Heritage Sites in Japan
National Treasures of Japan
Shugendō